Artūrs Bērziņš (born June 12, 1988) is a Latvian former basketball player, who plays the power forward position. For the 2017–2018 season he is signed with the BK Ventspils of the Latvian Basketball League. He is now youth basketball coach and an assistant coach for BK Ogre. 

He has represented the Latvian national team in EuroBasket 2011.

References

External links
 FIBA Europe profile

1988 births
Living people
BK Valmiera players
BK VEF Rīga players
BK Ventspils players
Latvian men's basketball players
People from Ogre, Latvia
Power forwards (basketball)